Hosoda (written: 細田) is a Japanese surname. Notable people with the surname include:

, Japanese volleyball player
Hiroshi Hosoda, Japanese general, vice chief of staff of the Ground Self-Defense Force
, Japanese politician
, Japanese film director and animator
, Japanese swimmer
, Japanese politician
, Japanese actor
, Japanese triathlete

Japanese-language surnames